Jack Keily (6 August 1898 – 2 February 1966) was an Australian rules footballer who played with Carlton in the Victorian Football League (VFL).

Notes

External links 		
		
Jack Keily's profile at Blueseum		
 
		
		
		
		
1898 births
Australian rules footballers from Victoria (Australia)		
Carlton Football Club players
1966 deaths
Place of birth missing
Place of death missing